The Colombian International also known as the Colombiano Internacional also known as the International Championships of Colombia or Campeonatos Internacionales de Colombia was a men's and women's clay court tennis tournament established in 1951 and played at the Country Club of Barranquilla, Barranquilla, Colombia until 1970.

The tournament was known locally as the City of Barranquilla Championships or Campeonato Ciudad de Barranquilla.

History
The Colombian International (Colombiano Internacional) and known locally as the City of Barranquilla Championships (Campeonato Ciudad de Barranquilla) was established in 1951, and played on clay courts initially in Bogotá, before moving to the Country Club of Barranquilla, Barranquilla, Colombia. The tournament was part Caribbean Circuit which was a major feature of the international tennis scene in from the 1950s to early 1970s. The tournament was staged annually until 1970 when it was discontinued.

In 1977 after a period of seven-year a new men's only successor tournament was revived called the International Tennis Championships of Colombia, but this time was staged in Bogotá, Colombia that event ran until 1980.

Finals

Men's Singles
Incomplete roll
Results included:

Women's Singles
Incomplete roll

References

Clay court tennis tournaments
Defunct tennis tournaments in Colombia